"Make It Hot" is the first single from Nicole's debut album of the same name. The single was released June 2, 1998. The single was written by Missy "Misdemeanor" Elliott, Tim Mosley, and A. Richards, and was produced by Timbaland. The song features Mocha and Missy Elliott and uncredited lead and background vocals from Keli Nicole Price.

Music video

The official music video for the song was directed by Christopher Erskin. It takes place in a movie theater. It starts with Missy Elliott's voice coming first, then leads into Mocha's rap verse with Nicole standing beside her. Later, in another room, Nicole and her dancers are dancing to the music while Nicole is singing. Cameo appearances are made by Aaliyah, Playa, Ginuwine, Timbaland and Magoo. The video finishes with them singing the rest of the song and Nicole's dancers.

Chart performance
"Make It Hot" reached #5 on the Billboard Hot 100, #2 on the Hot R&B/Hip-Hop  Singles and Tracks, #5 on the Top 40 Mainstream, #6 on the Rhythmic Top 40, and #40 on the Top 40 Tracks. The song also hit #22 on the UK charts.

Weekly charts

Year-end charts

Certifications

|}

Track listing
Radio Version (featuring Missy "Misdemeanor" Elliott & Mocha) - 4:05
Instrumental - 4:28
Acapella (featuring Missy "Misdemeanor" Elliott & Mocha) - 3:48

References

1998 debut singles
Missy Elliott songs
Music videos directed by Christopher Erskin
Nicole Wray songs
Song recordings produced by Timbaland
Songs written by Missy Elliott
Songs written by Timbaland
Hip hop soul songs
1998 songs